David McFarlane is the name of:

 David McFarlane (footballer) (born 1979), Scottish footballer
 David McFarlane (cyclist) (born 1959), Australian cyclist
 David McFarlane (attorney), Canadian lawyer